is a Japanese manga series written by Amahara and illustrated by Coolkyousinnjya. It has been serialized in Hakusensha's seinen manga magazine Young Animal since August 2018 and has been collected in five tankōbon volumes. It is a remake of Amahara's online manga by the same name, which he originally started in 2008, before his commercial debut, and stopped updating in 2016. An anime television series adaptation by MAPPA aired from July to October 2021 on Fuji TV's Noitamina programming block.

Plot
About 800 years ago, monstrous demons attacked and threatened mankind's existence; while at risk of being extinct, all the humans began praying to their respective gods, hoping for someone or something to save every one from the brink of destruction. With their prayers answered, a race of deities called the "Idaten" were created, by using their utmost endurance and powerful god-like abilities: the Idaten manage to defeat the demons, saving humanity and bringing peace to the entire world. Now in the present time, the newer generation of the Idaten only know little about the demons since they've all lived peaceful lives. Training under Rin, the only remaining original Idaten from 800 years ago, the new Idaten find ways to survive in a time where they have seemingly outlived their usefulness. Suddenly, when the tyrannical Zoble Empire resurrects a demon, the misfit warriors are called to the battlefield against their natural enemy once more.

Characters

Media

Manga
The Idaten Deities Know Only Peace manga written and by Amahara and illustrated by Coolkyousinnjya, started in Hakusensha's seinen manga magazine Young Animal on August 24, 2018. Hakusensha has collected its chapters into individual tankobon volumes. The first volume was released on January 29, 2019. As of February 28, 2023, seven volumes have been released. The manga has been licensed in English by Seven Seas Entertainment.

Volume list

Anime
An anime television series adaptation was announced on August 11, 2020. The series is animated by MAPPA and directed by Seimei Kidokoro, with Hiroshi Seko handling series' composition, and Nao Ootsu designing the characters. It aired from July 23 to October 1, 2021 on Fuji TV's Noitamina block. Tatsuya Kitani performed the series' opening theme song "Seija no Kōshin". Crunchyroll licensed the series outside of Asia. Medialink has licensed the series in Southeast Asia and South Asia, and is streaming it on their Ani-One YouTube channel, but this series is only viewable in their YouTube channel with Ani-One Ultra Membership scheme.

Episode list

Notes

References

External links
 
 
 

2021 anime television series debuts
Anime series based on manga
Aniplex
Crunchyroll anime
Dark fantasy anime and manga
Hakusensha manga
MAPPA
Medialink
Noitamina
Seinen manga
Seven Seas Entertainment titles